Posledniya Izvestia was a publication brought out by the Bund Committee Abroad, published in London and Geneva 1901–1906.

References

Communist magazines
Defunct magazines published in Switzerland
Defunct political magazines published in the United Kingdom
Magazines published in London
Magazines established in 1901
Magazines disestablished in 1906
Magazines published in Geneva
Political magazines published in Switzerland
Russian-language magazines